Conconully is a town in Okanogan County, Washington, United States. The population was 210 at the 2010 census.

History
The name Conconully comes from the Okanogan name for Salmon Creek, /qʷúnqʷunɬp/, which flows from Conconully to the Okanogan River at Okanogan. According to historian Harry M. Majors, the word means "cloudy".  Originally named Salmon City after the nearby Salmon Creek, Conconully began as a gold miners camp, and served as the county seat from 1888 to 1914. It was officially incorporated on November 11, 1908.

On May 27, 1894, the town was devastated when an unusually heavy storm caused Salmon Creek to overflow. Debris-filled water more than 30 feet high rushed through canyons toward the town. One resident witnessed the oncoming flood and rode his horse through town warning the residents. More than 42 buildings were destroyed and one person was killed.

Geography
Conconully is located at  (48.558820, -119.751054).

The city is flanked by two separate reservoirs of the United States Bureau of Reclamation, created by the 1911 Conconully Dam and the 1921 Salmon Lake Dam.

Climate
This climatic region is typified by large seasonal temperature differences, with warm to hot (and often humid) summers and cold (sometimes severely cold) winters.  According to the Köppen Climate Classification system, Conconully has a humid continental climate, abbreviated "Dfb" on climate maps.

Demographics

2010 census
As of the census of 2010, there were 210 people, 103 households, and 63 families living in the town. The racial makeup of the town was 91.0% White, 0.5% African American, 2.4% Native American, 0.5% Asian, 3.3% from other races, and 2.4% from two or more races. Hispanic or Latino of any race were 5.7% of the population.

There were 103 households, of which 13.6% had children under the age of 18 living with them, 55.3% were married couples living together, 2.9% had a female householder with no husband present, 2.9% had a male householder with no wife present, and 38.8% were non-families. 31.1% of all households were made up of individuals, and 7.7% had someone living alone who was 65 years of age or older. The average household size was 2.04 and the average family size was 2.49.

The median age in the town was 55.1 years. 12.4% of residents were under the age of 18; 5.6% were between the ages of 18 and 24; 11.9% were from 25 to 44; 43.4% were from 45 to 64; and 26.7% were 65 years of age or older. The gender makeup of the town was 51.9% male and 48.1% female.

2000 census
As of the census of 2000, there were 185 people, 94 households, and 53 families living in the town. The population density was 834.3 people per square mile (324.7/km2). There were 192 housing units at an average density of 865.8 per square mile (337.0/km2). The racial makeup of the town was 96.22% White, 3.24% Native American, and 0.54% from two or more races.

There were 94 households, out of which 13.8% had children under the age of 18 living with them, 47.9% were married couples living together, 6.4% had a female householder with no husband present, and 42.6% were non-families. 31.9% of all households were made up of individuals, and 12.8% had someone living alone who was 65 years of age or older. The average household size was 1.97 and the average family size was 2.43.

In the town, the population was spread out, with 11.9% under the age of 18, 3.8% from 18 to 24, 21.6% from 25 to 44, 32.4% from 45 to 64, and 30.3% who were 65 years of age or older. The median age was 52 years. For every 100 females, there were 107.9 males. For every 100 females age 18 and over, there were 103.8 males.

The median income for a household in the town was $23,214, and the median income for a family was $24,750. Males had a median income of $29,167 versus $22,000 for females. The per capita income for the town was $16,168. About 17.5% of families and 18.7% of the population were below the poverty line, including 21.7% of those under the age of eighteen and none of those 65 or over.

References

Towns in Okanogan County, Washington
Towns in Washington (state)
Populated places in the Okanagan Country
Washington placenames of Native American origin